Julian Mark Ovenden (born 29 November 1976) is an English actor and singer. He has starred on Broadway and West End stages, in television series in both the United Kingdom and United States, in films, and performed internationally as a concert and recording artist.

Early life and education
Ovenden was born on 29 November 1976 in Sheffield, South Yorkshire. He is one of three children of the Reverend Canon John Ovenden, a former chaplain to Queen Elizabeth II. He sang in the St Paul's Cathedral Choir, London as a child. He later won a music scholarship to Eton College. He subsequently read music at New College, Oxford on a choral scholarship.

Whilst he has received training as an opera singer, he has professionally used his music training in musical theatre. He continued academic studies in drama at the Webber Douglas Academy of Dramatic Art.

Career
His theatre work includes the multi award-winning Merrily We Roll Along and Grand Hotel for Michael Grandage at the Donmar Warehouse; Annie Get Your Gun for Richard Jones at The Young Vic; Michael Legrand's Marguerite at the Haymarket for Jonathan Kent; King Lear for Yukio Ninagawa at the RSC; Butley at the Booth Theatre on Broadway opposite Nathan Lane; Death Takes a Holiday for The Roundabout Theatre Company in New York; A Woman of No Importance for Adrian Noble at the Haymarket; Finding Neverland for The Weinstein Company; the Parisian premiere of Sunday in the Park with George; Show Boat at the Lincoln Centre in New York; My Night with Reg at the Donmar Warehouse; Ivo van Hove's All About Eve at the Noel Coward Theatre opposite Gillian Anderson; and South Pacific at the Chichester Festival Theatre.

Ovenden has also sung musical theatre songs in several concerts at the Proms, in particular concerts of Stephen Sondheim and of Rodgers and Hammerstein.  In 2015, he played Captain Georg von Trapp in the ITV live musical adaptation, The Sound of Music Live.

Ovenden first appeared on British TV in a recurring role over five seasons of Foyle's War opposite Michael Kitchen. He also appeared in two seasons of Downton Abbey. Other British TV work includes The Forsyte Saga, Any Human Heart, and The Royal. On US TV, Ovenden was a recurring cast member in Person of Interest (Jeremy Lambert) for three years. He has also appeared in seasons of Cashmere Mafia, Related and SMASH. Recently he has portrayed Robert F. Kennedy in The Crown and is starring as William de Nogaret in Knightfall.

Ovenden's recent film work includes Colonia opposite Emma Watson and Daniel Bruhl, The Confessions with Daniel Auteuil, Toni Servillo and Connie Nielsen and British indie war film, Allies (Captain Gabriel Jackson).

As a solo singer Ovenden has appeared with many of the world's leading orchestras, including the New York Philharmonic, the New York Pops, The Northern Sinfonia, the Liverpool Philharmonic, the Royal Philharmonic Orchestra, the London Philharmonic Orchestra, the John Wilson Orchestra, the Royal Concertgebouw Orchestra and the BBC Concert Orchestra. He has also appeared at The Proms at London's Royal Albert Hall, where he is a regular performer. Ovenden made his Carnegie Hall debut in 2014 and followed it up with another concert in 2015.

Ovenden recorded a debut album for Decca Records in 2013 titled If You Stay and has since made a Rodgers and Hammerstein record with John Wilson for Warner Classics and a Downton Abbey Christmas record for Warner Music that went double platinum. In late 2015, he signed a multiple record deal with East West Records and his new album was released in February 2016.

Personal life
Ovenden lives with his wife, opera singer Kate Royal, and their son and daughter.

Filmography

Film

Television

Theatre

References

External links

 
 

1976 births
20th-century English male actors
21st-century English male actors
21st-century English singers
Alumni of New College, Oxford
Alumni of the Webber Douglas Academy of Dramatic Art
English male film actors
English male singers
English male stage actors
English male television actors
Living people
Male actors from Sheffield
Musicians from Sheffield
People educated at Eton College
People educated at St. Paul's Cathedral School
21st-century British male singers
Choral Scholars of New College, Oxford